The Austrian Landtage are the unicameral legislatures of the nine Austrian states, according to the Constitution of Austria deciding in all matters unless explicitly subject of federal legislation. On federal level the Landtage are represented in the Federal Council.

Eight political parties are represented in the Landtage, of which five are represented in more than one. Currently, the Austrian People's Party (ÖVP), Social Democratic Party of Austria (SPÖ), and Freedom Party of Austria (FPÖ) are represented in all nine Landtage. The Greens are represented in eight, and NEOS – The New Austria (NEOS) is represented in seven.

Composition

Parties involved in government are shaded; parties leading governments are indicated in bold.

Diagrams

References

Politics of Austria